Delfin ("dolphin") was a Greek submarine (actually called a "submersible", καταδυόμενον, according to the then current French terminology) which served during the Balkan Wars and World War I. It was the second submarine to enter service in the Greek navy, after the Nordenfelt I (in service 1886–1901), and is notable as the first submarine in the world to launch a torpedo attack (albeit without success) against a warship.

History
Delfin was ordered in 1910 from the Toulon shipyards along with its sister ship, . It was delivered to the Royal Hellenic Navy just before the outbreak of the First Balkan War. Its first captain, Lt Cmdr Stefanos Paparrigopoulos, together with the 17-man crew, had been sent to France to receive their training,  which, in the event, was cut short when the outbreak of the war became inevitable. The Navy Ministry ordered them to sail home, and Delfin sailed from France on 29 September, arriving in Corfu on the very outbreak of the war, 4 October. This unescorted, non-stop journey of 1,100 miles set a world record and confirmed the abilities of its crew, despite their limited training. However, it also meant that no reserve crew could be trained, limiting its battle effectiveness due to the crew's fatigue.

From Corfu the submarine sailed to the main Greek naval station at Piraeus, where it remained until 19 October, its crew completing their training and preparations. From Piraeus, Delfin joined the Fleet at its forward anchorage of Moudros Bay in Lemnos, but did not sail out until the end of November, instead being engaged in diving exercises. Although the vessel was plagued by numerous mechanical problems, after 20 November it began patrolling outside the Dardanelles, retiring to Tenedos during the nights.

At 10:40, Delfin launched a torpedo against Mecidiye from a distance of 800 meters, but failed to sink it, as the torpedo broke surface and passed by the ship. This is the first recorded launch of a torpedo by a submarine in battle. In its attempt to return to Tenedos, the ship ran aground on a shoal north of the island, and had to drop its lead ballast in order to escape. This however meant that the ship was unable to submerge any more, and therefore sailed back to Piraeus. Delfin, along with Xifias and the rest of the Greek fleet, were confiscated by the French in 1916, during the Greek National Schism. When they were returned in 1919, they were in a poor condition, and the following year, they were decommissioned.

Tradition
Two other vessels of the Hellenic Navy have received the name Delfin: the British V class submarine Delfin II (Υ-9) (in service 1945–1957) and a German Type 149 Silbermöwe torpedo boat (in service 1968–1974).

External links
Photos of the submarine and the crew:
 Mezeviris Gregory,  Vice-Admiral of the Royal Hellenic Navy, "Four decades in the Service of the R.H.N (Royal Hellenic Navy).", Athens 1971.
 Hydra, country of my soul

References

Greek Delfin-class submarines
Ships built in France
1912 ships
Military units and formations of Greece in the Balkan Wars
World War I submarines of Greece
World War I submarines of France